Colors Super is an Indian general entertainment channel, owned by Viacom 18, that primarily broadcasts Kannada-language entertainment shows. This channel was launched on 24 July 2016, after the success of Kannada's leading entertainment channel,  Colors Kannada, the primary Kannada entertainment channel of Viacom 18.

Current broadcasts
Colors Super telecasts dubbed versions of various famous Indian series and re - telecasts super hit reality shows from its sister channel, Colors Kannada.

Former broadcasts

Original serials

Reality shows

Dubbed serials

External links

References

Television stations in Bangalore
Kannada-language television channels
Television channels and stations established in 2016
2016 establishments in Karnataka
Viacom 18